= Carol Taylor-Little =

American politician

Carol Taylor-Little (born c.1942) is an American politician. She served in the Colorado House of Representatives as a Republican, representing Jefferson County from 1983-1990. She chaired the majority caucus.

Taylor-Little lived in Arvada, Colorado.
